Lathrecista is a genus of dragonflies in the family Libellulidae. 
There is only one known species of this genus which occurs in India through Southeast Asia and Australia.

Species
The genus Lathrecista contains a single species:

Lathrecista asiatica

References

Libellulidae
Anisoptera genera
Monotypic Odonata genera
Odonata of Asia
Odonata of Australia
Taxa named by William Forsell Kirby
Insects described in 1889